The 57th Boat Race took place on 31 March 1900.  Held annually, the Boat Race is a side-by-side rowing race between crews from the Universities of Oxford and Cambridge along the River Thames.  Cambridge won by twenty lengths in a record-equalling time of 18 minutes 45 seconds, taking the overall record in the event to 32–24 in Oxford's favour.

Background

The Boat Race is a side-by-side rowing competition between the University of Oxford (sometimes referred to as the "Dark Blues") and the University of Cambridge (sometimes referred to as the "Light Blues").  The race was first held in 1829, and since 1845 has taken place on the  Championship Course on the River Thames in southwest London.  The rivalry is a major point of honour between the two universities and followed throughout the United Kingdom and worldwide.  Cambridge went into the race as reigning champions, having won the 1899 race by  lengths, while Oxford led overall with 32 victories to Cambridge's 23 (excluding the "dead heat" of 1877).  Leading up to the race, Oxford suffered a variety of misfortune:  M. C. McThornhill was ordered by his doctor not to row, H. J. Hale was injured and president Felix Warre contracted scarlet fever.

Cambridge were coached by James Brookes Close, who had rowed for the Light Blues three times between 1872 and 1874, and Stanley Muttlebury, five-time Blue for Cambridge between 1886 and 1890.  Oxford's coaches were Harcourt Gilbey Gold (Dark Blue president the previous year and four-time Blue) and Douglas McLean (an Oxford Blue five times between 1883 and 1887). The umpire for the race for the eleventh year in a row was Frank Willan who had won the event four consecutive times, rowing for Oxford in the 1866, 1867, 1868 and 1869 races.

Crews
Oxford's crew contained three members with Boat Race experience: C. E. Johnston, C. W. Tomlkinson and cox G. S. Maclagan. Cambridge saw six of their 1899 crew return, including William Dudley Ward and Raymond Broadly Etherington-Smith, both of whom were rowing in their third race. Eight of the nine Light Blues were students at Trinity College. Oxford's stroke H. H. Dutton, a native of South Australia, was the only non-British participant registered in the race. Author and former Oxford rower George Drinkwater suggested that this year's Cambridge crew, along with the Oxford crew which rowed in the 1897 race, "stand in a class by themselves among University crews." He also described the Oxford crew as "one of the poorest that ever came from the Isis".

Race

Oxford won the toss and elected to start from the Surrey station, handing the Middlesex side of the river to Cambridge.  In good conditions, umpire Willan got the race under way at 2:00p.m. whereupon Cambridge took the lead immediately.  By Craven Steps they were three lengths ahead and continued to draw away from the Dark Blues, to win by 20 lengths in a time of 18 minutes 45 seconds.  It was the fastest winning time in the history of the event, equalling that set by Oxford in the 1893 race.  Although it was the Light Blues' second consecutive victory, it followed a run of nine consecutive wins for Oxford – overall the Dark Blues led 32–24.

References
Notes

Bibliography

External links
 Official website

1900 in English sport
The Boat Race
March 1900 sports events
1900 in rowing
1900 sports events in London